Costanera Norte is a 43 km privatized expressway (autopista urbana) in Chile, connecting northern Santiago from east to west, along the northern bank of the Mapocho River, using an electronic toll collection system. It was inaugurated on 12 April 2005.

The expressway connects Santiago's wealthiest districts with the downtown and the airport.

References

External links
 Costanera Norte official web site

Toll roads in Chile